Jarrow is a constituency represented in the House of Commons of the UK Parliament since 2019 by Kate Osborne of the Labour Party.

The seat was created in the Redistribution of Seats Act 1885.

Boundaries

1885–1918 

 The Sessional Division of South Shields; 
 the Municipal Boroughs of Jarrow and South Shields; and 
 so much of the Parish of Heworth as is not included in the Municipal Borough of Gateshead.

NB included only non-resident freeholders in the parliamentary borough of South Shields.

The constituency was created for the 1885 general election by the Redistribution of Seats Act 1885 as one of eight new single-member divisions of the county of Durham, replacing the two 2-member seats of North Durham and South Durham. See map on Vision of Britain website.

1918–1950 

 The Borough of Jarrow; and
 the Urban Districts of Felling and Hebburn.

Areas to the south and east transferred to the expanded constituencies of South Shields and Houghton-le-Spring (the Boldons).

1950–1955 

 The Borough of Jarrow; and
 the Urban Districts of Boldon, Felling, and Hebburn.

Regained the Boldons from Houghton-le-Spring.

1955–1983 

 The Borough of Jarrow; and
 the Urban Districts of Boldon and Hebburn.

Felling transferred to Gateshead East. Redesignated as a borough constituency.

1983–1997 

 The Metropolitan Borough of South Tyneside wards of Bede, Biddick Hall, Boldon Colliery, Cleadon and East Boldon, Fellgate and Hedworth, Hebburn Quay, Hebburn South, Monkton, Primrose, and Whitburn and Marsden.

Minor changes to take account of ward boundaries of the newly formed metropolitan borough, including the transfer of Biddick Hall from South Shields.

1997–2010 

 The Metropolitan Borough of South Tyneside wards of Bede, Boldon Colliery, Cleadon and East Boldon, Fellgate and Hedworth, Hebburn Quay, Hebburn South, Monkton, Primrose, and Whitburn and Marsden; and
 the Metropolitan Borough of Gateshead ward of Wrekendyke.

Biddick Hall returned to South Shields; Wrekendyke transferred from the abolished constituency of Gateshead East.

2010–present 

 The Metropolitan Borough of South Tyneside wards of Bede, Boldon Colliery, Cleadon and East Boldon, Fellgate and Hedworth, Hebburn North, Hebburn South, Monkton, and Primrose; and
 the Metropolitan Borough of Gateshead wards of Pelaw and Heworth, and Wardley and Leam Lane.

Boundary changes for the 2010 general election transferred the community of Whitburn into the neighbouring South Shields seat. Pelaw and Heworth transferred from the abolished constituency of Gateshead East and Washington West. (The Wrekendyke ward had been renamed Wardley and Leam Lane).

Constituency profile
The constituency currently consists of part of the metropolitan district of South Tyneside, including the settlements of Jarrow, Boldon, Cleadon and Hebburn, as well as two wards from the adjacent Metropolitan Borough of Gateshead, covering Pelaw and Wardley.

In 2005 The Guardian described Jarrow as:

Political history
The last Liberal to serve the seat lost his seat at the 1922 general election and the last Conservative to serve the seat held it from 1931 to 1935, since which it has been served by MPs from the Labour Party.

Since 1935, just five people have served as MP for Jarrow; the first, Ellen Wilkinson, served as Labour's first Minister of Education during the first Attlee government. While the seat has been loyally Labour by comfortable margins since 1935, it has seen unusual swings a number of times; in the 1983 Conservative landslide, incumbent MP Don Dixon actually increased his majority; in the close 1992 election his majority fell somewhat despite the general swing to Labour; and in 2001 his successor Stephen Hepburn managed to increase his majority to 51.1% (incidentally the biggest any candidate has ever held in the seat).

Members of Parliament

Elections

Elections in the 2010s

This was the only seat in England at the 2019 general election where five candidates saved their deposit by securing over 5% of the vote.

Elections in the 2000s

Elections in the 1990s

Elections in the 1980s

Elections in the 1970s

Elections in the 1960s

Elections in the 1950s

Elections in the 1940s

Elections in the 1930s

Elections in the 1920s

Elections in the 1910s

Elections in the 1900s

Elections in the 1890s

Elections in the 1880s

    = N/A

See also
 List of parliamentary constituencies in Tyne and Wear
 History of parliamentary constituencies and boundaries in Tyne and Wear
 History of parliamentary constituencies and boundaries in Durham

Notes

References

Jarrow
Parliamentary constituencies in Tyne and Wear
Constituencies of the Parliament of the United Kingdom established in 1885